The Connecticut Mirror (also known as the CT Mirror) is an online-only newspaper headquartered in Hartford, Connecticut, founded in 2009 with $1.8 million in startup funding by the nonprofit Connecticut News Project and composed of former staff from the Hartford Courant. It focuses on public policy and political issues in the state.

The Mirror has 10 full- and part-time staff members, including one in Washington, D.C. In September 2018, it was announced that the Hearst Connecticut Media Group had agreed to carry The Mirror's coverage related to politics and policy on the publisher's websites.

References

External links 

 
  Encyclo: an encyclopedia of the future of news

Mass media in Hartford, Connecticut
American news websites
Nonprofit newspapers